The 2006 Brut Sun Bowl featured the Oregon State Beavers of the Pac-10 and the Missouri Tigers of the Big 12 Conference.

Running back Tony Temple started the scoring for Missouri as he took a handoff and ran 7 yards for a touchdown, to give Missouri an early 7–0 lead. Quarterback Matt Moore threw a 13-yard touchdown pass to wide receiver Sammie Stroughter to tie the game at 7. Matt Moore later ran for a 1-yard touchdown to increase the lead to 14–7.

Missouri placekicker Jeff Wolfert kicked a 30-yard field goal to cut the lead to 14–10. Quarterback Chase Daniel threw a 74-yard touchdown pass to wide receiver Danario Alexander, to give the lead to Missouri, 17–14.

In the third quarter, Matt Moore found all Pac-10 tight end Joe Newton for an 11-yard touchdown pass and a 21–17 Oregon State lead. Tight end Chase Coffman took a handoff, but then threw to a streaking Tommy Saunders for a 29-yard touchdown to give Missouri a 24–21 lead. Tony Temple later broke free on a 65-yard touchdown run to stretch the lead to 31–21.

Oregon State kicker Alexis Serna drilled a 29-yard field goal to cut the lead to 31–24. With 12:08 left in the game, Chase Daniel found Chase Coffman in the end zone for an 18-yard touchdown, stretching the lead to 38–24. With 6:02 left in the game, Matt Moore threw a 7-yard touchdown pass to running back Yvenson Bernard, to trim the lead to 38–31. Moore later fired a 14-yard touchdown pass to Joe Newton with only 23 seconds left to make it 38–37. Yvenson Bernard plowed ahead on the two-point conversion attempt, and Oregon State won 39–38.

Rihanna performed at halftime.

References

Sun Bowl
Sun Bowl
Missouri Tigers football bowl games
Oregon State Beavers football bowl games
December 2006 sports events in the United States
2006 in sports in Texas